Southbank Centre is a complex of artistic venues in London, England, on the South Bank of the River Thames (between Hungerford Bridge and Waterloo Bridge).

It comprises three main performance venues (the Royal Festival Hall including the National Poetry Library, the Queen Elizabeth Hall and the Purcell Room), together with the Hayward Gallery, and is Europe’s largest centre for the arts. It attracted 4.36 million visitors during 2019. Over two thousand paid performances of music, dance and literature are staged at Southbank Centre each year, as well as over two thousand free events and an education programme, in and around the performing arts venues. In addition, three to six major art exhibitions are presented at the Hayward Gallery yearly, and national touring exhibitions reach over 100 venues across the UK.

Location 
Southbank Centre's site, which formerly extended to 21 acres (85,000 m2) from County Hall to Waterloo Bridge, is fronted by The Queen’s Walk. In 2012 management of Jubilee Gardens transferred to the Jubilee Gardens Trust and the car park on the remaining land beyond Hungerford Bridge was sold in 2013, to extend the gardens as part of the Shell Centre redevelopment. The site is next to the National Theatre and BFI Southbank, but does not include them.

The closest Underground stations are Waterloo and Embankment.

Personnel 

Misan Harriman became chairman of the Board of Governors of the Southbank Centre in 2022, succeeding Susan Gilchrist, who had held the role since 2016. Elaine Bedell was appointed as Chief Executive in 2017; from 2009 to 2016 that position was held by Alan Bishop, former chairman of Saatchi & Saatchi International and Chief Executive of the Central Office of Information.

September 2005 saw the arrival of Jude Kelly as the centre's Artistic Director. After Kelly stepped down in order to devote herself to the Women of the World Festival, Madani Younis (previously Artistic Director at the Bush Theatre) was appointed to the new role of Creative Director from January 2019, to work alongside Gillian Moore, the Director of Music, and Ralph Rugoff, Director of the Hayward Gallery. Younis resigned in October 2019.

The role of artistic director remained vacant until the appointment of the former creative director of Manchester International Festival, Mark Ball who took up his position at the Southbank in January 2022.

History

1950s 

The history of Southbank Centre starts with the Festival of Britain, held in 1951. In what was described as "a tonic for the nation" by Herbert Morrison, the Labour Party government minister responsible for the event, the Festival of Britain aimed to demonstrate Britain’s recovery from World War II by showcasing the best in science, technology, arts and industrial design. It ran from May to September 1951, and by June the following year most of it had been dismantled, following the victory of Winston Churchill and the Conservative Party in the general election of 1951. The Royal Festival Hall is the only building from the Festival of Britain that survives.

1960s 
From 1962 to 1965, the Royal Festival Hall was extended towards the river and Waterloo station and refurbished. The London County Council (later, Greater London Council) decided in 1955 to build a second concert hall and an art gallery on the eastern part of the South Bank site previously occupied by a lead works and shot tower (and which had been earmarked as a site for the National Theatre). It was another 12 years before the Queen Elizabeth Hall and the linked Purcell Room opened to the public. Together, they were to be known as South Bank Concert Halls. In 1968, the Hayward opened, under direct management of the Arts Council. The new buildings had their main entrances at first floor level and were integrated into an extensive elevated concrete walkway system linked to the Royal Festival Hall and the Shell Centre. This vertical separation of pedestrian and vehicle traffic proved unpopular due to the difficulty pedestrians had in navigating through the complex, and the dark and under-used spaces at ground level below the walkways.

1980s 
Following abolition of the Greater London Council in 1986, the South Bank Board was formed to take over operational control of the concert halls. The following year, the South Bank Board took over the administrative running of the Hayward from the Arts Council. Collectively, the arts venues, along with Jubilee Gardens, became the South Bank Centre, responsible to Arts Council England as an independent arts institution (after transitional arrangements).

1990s 
The walkway on the east side of the RFH, running along Belvedere Road towards the Shell Centre was removed in 1999–2000, to restore ground level circulation. The Waterloo Site (the late 1960s buildings) has been the subject of various plans for modification or reconstruction, in particular a scheme developed by Richard Rogers in the mid-1990s which would have involved a great glass roof over the existing three buildings. This did not proceed due to the high degree of National Lottery funding required and likely high cost.

2000s 

In 2000, a masterplan for the South Bank Centre site was produced. The main features were
a new administration building for members of staff
the removal of access for delivery vehicles to the south of the Hungerford Bridge approach viaduct and east of the Hayward (by Waterloo Bridge);
the creation of three new public spaces around the RFH (Festival Riverside, Southbank Centre Square and Festival Terrace);
modification of the Queen Elizabeth Hall undercroft and the lower two levels of the Hayward to provide a frontage onto Southbank Centre Square; and
a new British Film Institute building partly underground  on the Hungerford Car Park site.

In line with the plans, in 2006-7 a new glass-fronted building was created to provide office space for Southbank Centre staff as well as a range of new shops and restaurants. This was inserted between the RFH and the approach viaduct to Hungerford Bridge. New restaurants and shops along the low level Thames elevation of the Royal Festival Hall replaced an earlier cafeteria area and accompanied pedestrianisation of this frontage, achieved by removing the circulation road. Between 2005 and 2007 the Festival Hall auditorium was modified, the natural acoustic enhanced to meet classical music requirements. Seating was also reconfigured, together with upgrades to production facilities and public areas, with provision of new bar areas, the removal of most shops from foyer spaces, and refurbished lifts and WCs.

2010s 
In early 2013 the Southbank Centre unveiled plans, which soon became a source of vigorous debate, for alterations to the Hayward Gallery and Queen Elizabeth Hall dubbed the "Festival Wing", funded by Arts Council England. The proposal would have provided arts spaces in a new high level L-shaped building linking the Hayward Gallery and Purcell Room buildings and with a wing running parallel to Waterloo Bridge behind the Queen Elizabeth Hall auditorium. Its features were to include a glass pavilion, new arts spaces, a literature centre, cafes and commercial units.

The proposed alterations would have replaced the skate park which has developed in the undercroft, hailed as the birthplace of British skateboarding, with retail units to fund the new arts spaces. By May 2014, the campaign group strongly opposing the proposals called Long Live Southbank had gained over 120,000 members. As well as the skateboarders, the National Theatre also had objections.

In early 2014, the scheme was put on hold when the Mayor of London, then Boris Johnson, said he would not support removal of the skateboarding area from the Queen Elizabeth Hall undercroft to under Hungerford Bridge. The development of the undercroft area was a key commercial and financing feature of the Festival Wing new building proposal and the scheme could not proceed in its proposed form without the commercial development or substitute funding which was not available in the amounts required.

"Let the Light In" scheme to conserve and refurbish buildings

Arts Council England awarded a £16m grant towards a two-year programme of repairs and conservation work on the Queen Elizabeth Hall, Purcell Room and Hayward Gallery in May 2014 and the scheme was granted planning permission in May 2015. The Southbank Centre also received funding for the conservation and limited alteration scheme, known as "Let the Light In", from the Heritage Lottery Fund and was raising funds from individuals for the final £3 million required.

This more conservation-orientated approach has also included joining with the National Trust to make the centre's 1960s buildings' contribution to the Brutalist movement better known. The buildings re-opened in 2018 following completion of the works.

Response to 2020 pandemic 
In response to the COVID-19 pandemic, which halted live performances and closed exhibitions, most of the centre's 600 employees were furloughed, and in July 2020 up to 400 were expected to be made redundant. The Hayward Gallery reopened in August but the Royal Festival Hall and Queen Elizabeth Hall were expected to remain closed until April 2021.

Resident orchestras 
The resident orchestras at Southbank Centre are:
London Philharmonic Orchestra
Philharmonia Orchestra
London Sinfonietta
Orchestra of the Age of Enlightenment
Aurora Orchestra
Chineke! Orchestra

References

External links 

 www.concretecentre.org (Concrete Quarterly No. 72, 1968 including article on the South Bank Arts Centre - Hayward, Queen Elizabeth Hall and Purcell Room)
 PS (Public Space) article, c.2015 about the design, construction, and reactions to the Southbank Centre (originally the South Bank Arts Centre)
 The Long Live Southbank campaign to save the skate park in the QEH undercroft location
 Aerial photos of the site in 1922 and 1946

 
Arts centres in London
Buildings and structures in the London Borough of Lambeth
Buildings and structures on the River Thames
Brutalist architecture in London
Culture in London
Music venues in London
Performing arts centres in the United Kingdom
Skateparks in the United Kingdom